KNVE may refer to:

 KNVE (FM), a radio station (91.3 FM) licensed to serve Redding, California, United States
 KKLP, a radio station (91.1 FM) licensed to serve Perris, California, which held the call sign KNVE from 2015 to 2017